Viktor Popovic is Partner of EnCor Capital Management, an independent investment advisory group in Prague Czech Republic, focused on the needs of entrepreneurs and owner led businesses, as well as private and institutional investors. 

Prior to co-founding EnCor, Viktor was CEO of European American Investment Bank AG in Vienna for 12 years, and prior to that, Director at McKinsey & Company. Prior to returning to the Czech Republic, he worked in the United States, Australia, United Kingdom, Germany, Austria, and Central Europe for banking, telecoms, industrial, energy and government clients on major strategy, organisation, restructuring and performance improvement projects. During his 18-year career with McKinsey, Viktor set up, built and managed the Prague office of McKinsey.

Viktor was educated at the University of Cologne, Germany and also received an MBA from the University of Chicago in 1983. He is fluent in German, English, Czech, Slovak, Portuguese and Spanish.

References

Year of birth missing (living people)
Living people
University of Cologne alumni
University of Chicago alumni